The Wellington Catholic District School Board is a school board in Ontario, Canada, serving the students of the City of Guelph and Wellington County. There are 4 high schools and 18 elementary schools serving roughly 8000 students.

History
The Wellington Catholic District School Board is the successor to the Wellington Catholic Separate School Board, which was established in the mid-1960s when it operated English and French schools. In 1998, after the Fewer School Boards Act of 1997 was passed, the boards became as follows:

The English-language Separate District School Board No. 48
The French-language Separate District School Board No. 64, which evolved into Conseil scolaire de district catholique Centre-Sud.

English-language Separate District School Board No. 48, became known as the Wellington Catholic District School Board in 1999.

Program
Wellington Catholic provides education from junior kindergarten to grade 12.

The Board also provides early literacy programs to support children in grades 1 through 3. Full Day Kindergarten is available at all elementary Catholic schools.

Schools
County Elementary Schools
Sacred Heart, Rockwood
St. John Catholic School, Arthur
St. John Brebeuf Catholic School, Erin
St. Joseph Catholic School, Fergus
St. Mary Catholic School, Elora
St. Mary Catholic School, Mount Forest

Guelph's Elementary Schools
Holy Rosary Catholic School
Holy Trinity Catholic School
Mary Phelan Catholic School
Sacred Heart Catholic School
St. Francis of Assisi Catholic School
St. Ignatius of Loyola Catholic School
St. John Catholic School
St. Joseph Catholic School
St. Michael Catholic School
St. Patrick Catholic School
St. Paul Catholic School
St. Peter Catholic School

Secondary Schools - City of Guelph
Bishop Macdonell Catholic High School
Our Lady of Lourdes Catholic High School
Saint James Catholic High School
St. John Bosco

Former Schools
Sacred Heart Catholic School, Kenilworth
St. Bernadette Catholic School, Guelph
St. Stanislaus Catholic School, Guelph
Former Bishop Macdonell Catholic High School, Downtown Guelph

See also
List of school districts in Ontario
List of high schools in Ontario

References

External links

Education in Guelph
Roman Catholic school districts in Ontario